Cecil Perry (3 March 1846 – 4 August 1917) was an Australian cricketer. He played first-class cricket for Tasmania and Canterbury.

See also
 List of Tasmanian representative cricketers

References

External links
 

1846 births
1917 deaths
Australian cricketers
Canterbury cricketers
Tasmania cricketers
Cricketers from Hobart